Blandin is a commune in the Isère department in the Auvergne-Rhône-Alpes region in Southeastern France. In 2018, it had a population of 148.

Geography
Blandin was established in 1801 from Virieu. Blandin is located 25 km (15.5 mi) from Voiron and 14 km (8.6 mi) from La Tour-du-Pin. The Bourbre forms the commune's eastern border.

Population

In 2017, the municipality had 145 inhabitants.

See also
Communes of the Isère department

References

Communes of Isère
Isère communes articles needing translation from French Wikipedia